"Heartbeat" is a song by the band King Crimson, released as a single in 1982. In the beginning of the music video there is a stream of faces blending into one another, one of the earliest examples of the dissolving/morphing technique which would later be employed in Godley & Creme's "Cry" and Michael Jackson's "Black or White".

The song was later recorded by King Crimson guitarist and singer Adrian Belew for his 1990 solo album, Young Lions.

Track listing

7" version
"Heartbeat" (Adrian Belew, Bill Bruford, Robert Fripp, Tony Levin)
"Requiem" (Edited version) (Belew, Bruford, Fripp, Levin)

12" version
"Heartbeat" (Belew, Bruford, Fripp, Levin)
"Neal and Jack and Me" (Belew, Bruford, Fripp, Levin)
"Sartori in Tangier" (Belew, Bruford, Fripp, Levin)

Personnel
Robert Fripp – guitar, organ
Adrian Belew – guitar, lead vocals
Tony Levin – bass guitar, Chapman stick, backing vocals
Bill Bruford – drums

References 

King Crimson songs
1982 singles
Songs written by Robert Fripp
Songs written by Adrian Belew
Songs written by Bill Bruford
Songs written by Tony Levin
1982 songs
Warner Records singles